William Norman VC (1832 – 13 March 1896) was an English recipient of the Victoria Cross, the highest and most prestigious award for gallantry in the face of the enemy that can be awarded to British and Commonwealth forces.

He was born in Warrington, Lancashire and enlisted as a private in the 7th Regiment of Foot (later the Royal Fusiliers) of the British Army on 15 May 1854.  During the Crimean War the following deed took place for which he was awarded the VC. On 19 December 1854 at Sebastopol, in the Crimea, Private Norman was placed on single sentry duty some distance in front of the advanced sentries of an outlying picquet in the White Horse Ravine, a post of much danger and requiring great vigilance. The Russian picquet was posted about 300 yards in front of him, and three Russians came reconnoitring under cover of the brushwood. Private Norman single-handedly took two of them prisoner without alarming the Russian picquet. He was decorated by Queen Victoria in Hyde Park on 26 June 1857. 

He later served in the Umbeyla Campaign on the North-West Frontier in 1863 and achieved the rank of corporal. He left the Army in 1865.

He died on 13 March 1896 in Salford, Lancashire and is buried in a common grave at Weaste Cemetery, Salford. He was married with three children. His Victoria Cross and other medals are displayed at the Royal Fusiliers Museum in the Tower of London, England.

References

Monuments to Courage (David Harvey, 1999)
The Register of the Victoria Cross (This England, 1997)

External links
Location of grave and VC medal (Manchester)

1832 births
1896 deaths
People from Warrington
Royal Fusiliers soldiers
British recipients of the Victoria Cross
Crimean War recipients of the Victoria Cross
British Army personnel of the Crimean War
British military personnel of the Umbeyla Campaign
British Army recipients of the Victoria Cross
Military personnel from Lancashire
Burials in Lancashire